Sir William Robert Burkitt (1838 – 16 June 1908) was an Irish judge in British India in the 19th and early 20th centuries.

Education 
From the Irish branch of a prominent family of judges, theologians, and doctors, Burkitt was born in Dublin. He was educated at Trinity College Dublin and called to the bar at Middle Temple.

He took the Indian Civil Service exams in 1860 and graduated to the Bengal Civil Service in 1869.

Career 
William Burkitt arrived in India 11 October 1861. From October 1862, he served in the North Western Provinces as Assistant Magistrate and Collector, Joint Magistrate and Deputy Collector, District and Sessions Judge (from 1862–1891) in Gorakhpur, Basti, Banda, Cawnpore (or Kanpur), Bareilly, Muzaffarnagar, Saharanpur, Etawah, Azamgarh, and Mathura, and, later, as a Judicial Commissioner in locations such as Oudh, Allahabad, Delhi and Calcutta.

He served as a High Court Judge in Allahabad (1895-1908) and was appointed Chief Justice of the United Provinces and as Puisne Judge (1895), the most senior category of judges in British India.

He was made a Knight Bachelor on 19 July 1904, the year of his retirement.

Freemasonry 
Burkitt was District Grand Mark Master of District Grand Mark Lodge, Bengal and then District Grandmaster of Bengal, presiding over Freemasonry for over half of India's population in the Bengal Presidency.

Emir of Afghanistan 
His most well-known achievement was, together with Lord Kitchener (then District Grandmaster of Punjab), to induct the Emir of Afghanistan Habibullah Khan at Freemasons Hall at Lodge Concordia in Park Street, Kolkata in 1907.  This lodge is the home of the United Grand Lodge of Bengal of which Burkitt was District Grandmaster.

An account of this highly unusual event was written at the time by Sir Henry McMahon.  It was performed in an unusual style, the Emir taking all three ordinary degrees of masonry at once - a rare event rumoured to signify membership of the Roshaniya.

Personal life 
Burkitt was married twice. He married first to Kathleen Dwyer (who was lost at sea) and then to Frances Gill. He had children with both wives. His son, William, also a judge, was tipped to follow in his father's footsteps but died young from pneumonia on 19 May 1918 in Nainital. There were several daughters, including Ethel Lilian Burkitt, who married in December 1902 Captain Charles Hampden Turner, Suffolk Regiment.

Later life 
He died in at Norris's Hotel, 48-53 Russell Road, Kensington, London on 16 June 1908.

References

External links
 http://www.lodgeofcharity4105.org.uk/news.html
 
 http://www.mightypeace.ca/AN_ACCOUNT_OF_THE_ENTRY_OF_H.pdf
 http://www.thedigitalfreemason.com/index2.php?option=com_content&do_pdf=1&id=66
 http://www.kinggeorgelodge.com/downloads/education/tdf059-royal_masonic_occasion.pdf
 http://nationalheritagemuseum.typepad.com/library_and_archives/freemasonry_and_colonialism/
 http://nationalheritagemuseum.typepad.com/.shared/image.html?/photos/uncategorized/2008/09/19/mcmahon_habibullah_khan.jpg
 http://www.ilovekolkata.in/index.php/My-City/How-the-plot-thickened.html
 https://books.google.com/books?id=3VQTAAAAYAAJ&pg=RA1-PA452&vq=Burkitt&dq=Judge+Sir+WR+Burkitt&source=gbs_search_s&cad=0
 http://www.allahabadhighcourt.in/event/LawAndLaughterGyanendraKumar.pdf

Knights Bachelor
Indian Civil Service (British India) officers
British India judges
1838 births
1908 deaths